Karol Stanisław Niemczycki (born 5 July 1999) is a Polish professional footballer who plays as a goalkeeper for Cracovia.

Club career
In 2019, he was loaned to Puszcza Niepołomice.

On 14 August 2020, he joined Cracovia.

International career
On 23 March 2021, he received an additional call-up for the Poland national team games against Andorra and England.

Honours
Individual
Ekstraklasa Young Player of the Month: October 2020

References

External links

1999 births
Living people
Footballers from Kraków
Polish footballers
Poland youth international footballers
Poland under-21 international footballers
Association football goalkeepers
NAC Breda players
Puszcza Niepołomice players
MKS Cracovia (football) players
Eredivisie players
I liga players
III liga players
Ekstraklasa players
Polish expatriate footballers
Expatriate footballers in the Netherlands
Polish expatriate sportspeople in the Netherlands